Cyprus competed at the 1996 Summer Olympics in Atlanta, United States.

Results by event

Athletics
Men's 100 metres:
 Anninos Marcoullides
Round 1: 10.26
Round 2: 10.13
Round 3: 10.23
Semifinal: 10.36
 Yannis Zisimidis
Round 1: 10.32
Round 2: 10.47

Men's 200 metres:
 Anninos Marcoullides
Final: 20.57 s (→ 11th place)

Men's 400 metres:
 Evripedes Demosthenous
Round 1: 46.76 s (→ 43rd place)

Men's 110 metres hurdles:
 Prodromos Katsantonis
Round 1: 14.34 (→ 57th place)

Men's 4x100 metres Relay:
 Anninos Marcoullides, Loukas Spyrou, Prodromos Katsantonis, Yannis Zisimidis
Round 1: 40.06

Men's Shot Put:
 Elias Louca
18.48m (→ 24th place)
 Michalis Louca
18.23m (→ 28th place)

Women's 200 metres:
 Theodora Kyriakou
23.85 (→ 39th place)

Women's 400 metres:
 Theodora Kyriakou
52.09 (→ 29th place)

Swimming
Men's 50 metres Freestyle:
 Stavros Michaelides
 Heat — 23.77 (→ did not advance, 31st place)

Men's 100 metres Freestyle:
 Stavros Michaelides
 Heat — 52.65 (→ did not advance)

Women's 200 metres Freestyle:
 Marina Zarma
 Heat — 2:10.85 (→ did not advance)

Women's 400 metres Freestyle:
 Marina Zarma 
 Heat — 4:32.15 (→ did not advance)

Shooting
Men's Skeet:
 Antonis Andeou — 121 points (→ 9th place)
 Antonis Nicolaides — 119 (→ 21st place) 
 Christos Kourtellas — 127 (→ 32nd place)

Sailing
Men's Double-Handed Dinghy (470)
 Petros Elton and Nikolas Epifaniou — 211 (→ 31st place)

Men's Board (Mistral)
 Dimitrios Lappas — 195 (32nd place)

Wrestling
Men's Featherweight (Freestyle)
 Arout Parsekian — 10th place

References
 sports-reference

Nations at the 1996 Summer Olympics
1996
Summer Olympics